Population fragmentation is a form of population segregation. It is often caused by habitat fragmentation.

Causes of Fragmentation
Fragmentation can be the cause of natural forces or human actions, although in modern times, human activity is the most common cause. Some general causes of fragmentation are:

 the development of land around a protected area, even through the addition of a single road lane or fence line,
 the captivity, capture or killing of species in an area that links populations,
 the movement of a population away from other individuals of that species, such as the natural introduction of wolves and moose on Isle Royale,
 geologic processes, such as landslides or volcanoes, dividing a habitat
 rising sea levels separating islands from what was once a common landmass,
 global warming, especially when coupled with mountains, reducing movement from one habitat to another.

Genetic effects
Population fragmentation causes inbreeding depression, which leads to a decrease in genetic variability in the species involved. This decreases the fitness of the population for several reasons. First, inbreeding forces competition with relatives, which decreases the evolutionary fitness of the species. Secondly, the decrease in genetic variability causes an increased possibility a lethal homozygous recessive trait may be expressed; this decreases the average litter size reproduced, indirectly decreasing the population. When a population is small, the influence of genetic drift increases, which leads to less and/or random fixation of alleles. In turn, this leads to increased homozygosity, negatively affecting individual fitness. The performance of plants may be compromised by less effective selection which causes an accumulation of deleterious mutations in small populations. Since individuals in small populations are more likely to be related, they are more likely to inbreed. A reduction in fitness may occur in small plant populations because of mutation accumulation, reduced genetic diversity, and increased inbreeding. Over time, the evolutionary potential and a species's ability to adapt to a changing environment, such as climate change, is decreased.

See also
 Metapopulation
 Wildlife corridor

References

 Fragmentation
Habitat
Environmental conservation